San Hei Tsuen is a village in Ping Shan, Yuen Long District, Hong Kong.

History
San Hei Tsuen is one of the three wais (walled villages) and six tsuens (villages) established by the Tang Clan of Ping Shan, namely: Sheung Cheung Wai, Kiu Tau Wai, Fui Sha Wai, Hang Tau Tsuen, Hang Mei Tsuen, Tong Fong Tsuen, San Tsuen, Hung Uk Tsuen and San Hei Tsuen.

Today
The area houses several industrial buildings, as well as temporary workshops and village houses.

See also
 Ping Shan Heritage Trail

References

External links
 Delineation of area of existing village Fui Sha Wai (Ping Shan) for election of resident representative (2019 to 2022) (includes San Hei Tsuen)
 Antiquities and Monuments Office. Hong Kong Traditional Chinese Architectural Information System. San Hei Tsuen

Villages in Yuen Long District, Hong Kong
Ping Shan